The Northern Borders Region is the least populated region of Saudi Arabia. It is located in the north of the country, bordering Iraq and Jordan. It has an area of 111,797 km2 and a population of 320,524 at the 2010 census. The region is sub-divided into three governorates: Arar, Rafha and Turayf. Its capital is Arar.

Population

Administrative divisions
The region is subdivided into four governorates:
 Arar (administrative center in Arar)
 Rafha (Rafha)
 Turayf (Turayf)
 Al Uwayqilah (Al Uwayqilah)

See also 

 List of cities and towns in Saudi Arabia

References

 
Provinces of Saudi Arabia